Donald Young was the defending champion, but did not complete in the Juniors this year.

Grigor Dimitrov defeated Henri Kontinen in the final, 7–5, 6–3 to win the boys' singles tennis title at the 2008 Wimbledon Championships.

Kontinen would go on to become a future World No. 1 doubles player and win the 2016 Mixed Doubles title at these Championships. This event also featured future Wimbledon Men's Singles finalist Milos Raonic.

Seeds

  Bernard Tomic (semifinals)
  Yang Tsung-hua (third round)
  César Ramírez (quarterfinals)
  Jerzy Janowicz (second round)
  Yuki Bhambri (first round)
  Henrique Cunha (quarterfinals)
  Ryan Harrison (second round)
  Marcelo Arévalo (first round)
  Grigor Dimitrov (champion)
  Cedrik-Marcel Stebe (second round)
  Alexei Grigorov (second round)
  Peerakit Siributwong (first round)
  David Goffin (first round)
  Chase Buchanan (second round)
  Marcus Willis (third round)
  Bradley Klahn (third round)

Draw

Finals

Top half

Section 1

Section 2

Bottom half

Section 3

Section 4

References

External links

Boys' Singles
Wimbledon Championship by year – Boys' singles